Highway 17 is a highway in Canada that straddles and criss-crosses the Alberta–Saskatchewan provincial border.

Highway 17 is considered a part of both provincial highway systems. The entire length of the highway is maintained jointly by the respective provincial governments.

Route description 

Saskatchewan Highway 14 is the continuation of Alberta Highway 13.

The highway first enters Alberta before reaching Dillberry Lake Provincial Park.  A short distance later, it intersects with Alberta Highway 610 and Saskatchewan Highway 680 before reaching Alberta Highway 14, which becomes Saskatchewan Highway 40.  For , Highway 17 runs east  concurrently with Alberta Highway 14.  The concurrency ends  shy of the provincial border.

From Alberta Highway 14 to Lloydminster, Highway 17 crosses the Battle River, passes by the Hamlet of Rivercourse, intersects Saskatchewan Highway 688, and intersects Alberta Highway 619. Its alignment runs concurrently with the provincial border from north of Saskatchewan Highway 688 to north of Saskatchewan Highway 798, crossing the Yellowhead Highway (Highway 16) within Lloydminster.

North of Saskatchewan Highway 798, prior to its intersection with Alberta Highway 45 and Saskatchewan Highway 3, Highway 17 briefly weaves into Saskatchewan and then Alberta before returning to the provincial boundary alignment.  Further to the north, prior to crossing the North Saskatchewan River, it weaves back and forth between the two provinces again.  After crossing the river, the highway again returns to the provincial boundary alignment and then ends at Onion Lake where it intersects with Alberta Highway 641.

In Lloydminster, Highway 17 runs along the Alberta-Saskatchewan border. It is named 50 Avenue and is historically called Meridian Avenue. Despite Lloydminster's size and 50 Avenue functioning as one of the primary north–south routes in the city, the highway is an undivided two-lane road for most of its course through the city.

History
Highway 17 was originally part of Saskatchewan Highway 21, which ran parallel to the Alberta border between Onion Lake and the South Saskatchewan River west of Empress, Alberta, then turning east to Leader, Saskatchewan, and following its present alignment to Saskatchewan Highway 13 near Robsart. In the 1930s, the section north of Empress was renumbered to Saskatchewan Highway 17; however, the section south of Macklin was decommissioned in the 1940s.

The original alignment of Alberta Highway 17 ran from Highway 16 west of Edmonton to Onoway, but was renumbered to Alberta Highway 43 so the Alberta designation could coincide with Saskatchewan Highway 17.

Future
In 2011, the City of Lloydminster commenced a project to add lanes to Highway 17.  Under the project, 50 Avenue will be widened in the southern part of the city. Through downtown, where widening is not feasible, the northbound lanes of Highway 17 will run along 49 Avenue within Saskatchewan, resulting in a couplet or one-way pair of streets.

Major intersections

See also 

Route 54 (Delaware–Maryland), a highway that similarly straddles a state line border in the United States
State Line Avenue in Texarkana, Texas and Arkansas

References 

017
017
Lloydminster